The 1994 Eastern Michigan Eagles football team represented Eastern Michigan University in the 1994 NCAA Division I-A football season. In their second and final season under head coach Ron Cooper, the Eagles compiled a 5–6 record (5–4 against conference opponents), finished in seventh place in the Mid-American Conference, and were outscored by their opponents, 285 to 247. The team's statistical leaders included Michael Armour with 1,629 passing yards, Stephen Whitfield with 1,232 rushing yards, and Steve Clay with 589 receiving yards.

Schedule

References

Eastern Michigan
Eastern Michigan Eagles football seasons
Eastern Michigan Eagles football